Ernest "Ernie" Brookes (first ¼ 1884 – July 1940), also known by the nickname of "The Terrier", was an English professional rugby league footballer who played in the 1900s, 1910s and 1920s.

Background
Ernie Brookes was born in Bewsey, Warrington, Lancashire, and his death aged 56 was registered in Warrington district, Lancashire, England.

Playing career

International honours
Ernie Brookes won a cap for England while at Warrington in 1908 against Wales, and won caps for Great Britain while at Warrington in 1908–09 against Australia (3 matches).

Challenge Cup Final appearances
Ernie Brookes played  in Warrington's 6–0 victory over Hull Kingston Rovers in the 1904–05 Challenge Cup Final during the 1904–05 season at Headingley Rugby Stadium, Leeds, in front of a crowd of 19,638, played , i.e. number 5, in the 17–3 victory over Oldham in the 1906–07 Challenge Cup Final during the 1906–07 season at Wheater's Field, Broughton, Salford on Saturday 27 April 1907, in front of a crowd of 18,500, and played , i.e. number 2, in the 5–9 defeat by Huddersfield in the 1912–13 Challenge Cup Final during the 1912–13 season at Headingley Rugby Stadium, Leeds, in front of a crowd of 22,754,

County Cup Final appearances
Ernie Brookes played, and scored a try in Warrington's 6–15 defeat by Broughton Rangers in the 1906 Lancashire County Cup Final during the 1906–07 season at Central Park, Wigan on Saturday 1 December 1906.

Notable tour matches
Ernie Brookes played  in Warrington's 10–3 victory over Australia in the 1908–09 Kangaroo tour of Great Britain tour match during the 1908–09 season at Wilderspool Stadium, Warrington, Saturday 14 November 1908, in front of a crowd of 5,000, due to the strikes in the cotton mills, the attendance was badly affected, the loss of earnings meant that some fans could not afford to watch the first tour by the Australian rugby league team.

Honoured at Warrington Wolves
Ernie Brookes is a Warrington Wolves Hall of Fame inductee.

Note
Ernest Brookes' surname is occasionally misspelt Brooks, i.e. without an 'e'.

References

External links
Statistics at wolvesplayers.thisiswarrington.co.uk
Statistics at wolvesplayers.thisiswarrington.co.uk (martini)* (archived by web.archive.org)

1884 births
1940 deaths
England national rugby league team players
English rugby league players
Great Britain national rugby league team players
Lancashire rugby league team players
Rugby league five-eighths
Rugby league halfbacks
Rugby league players from Warrington
Rugby league wingers
Warrington Wolves players